Langlen Thadoi is a 1984 Indian Meitei language film directed by M.A. Singh (Maibam Amuthoi Singh) and produced by Khaidem Sakhi Devi for Kay Pee Films International. It is the first Manipuri full-length colour film and also the first Manipuri film to be produced by a woman. W. Chandrasakhi and Sagolsem Tijendra are the playback singers of the songs in the film.

Cast
 W. Chandrasakhi
 K. Tejmani
 Moirangthem Lalit

References

Meitei-language films
1984 films